Kjartan Salvesen (born 17 October 1976 in Sandnes) is the winner of the second season of Norwegian version of Idol by 840.000 votes, the highest number for any participant on the show. His single "Standing Tall" sold 5 times platinum, making it the  most sold single of all time in Norway. He later released a self-titled album that sold platinum. He is also known to be a big fan of Viking FK and appeared in a performance on the opening of Viking Stadion.

He has also played in the highest Norwegian league in floorball.

Idol Performances
Audition: "Unwell" by matchbox twenty
Top 50: "Unwell" by matchbox twenty 
Top 11: "Sexed Up" by Robbie Williams 
Top 9:  "Bare I Nått" 
Top 8:  "Blame It On The Boogie" by Jackson 5 
Top 7:  "Sorry Seems To Be The Hardest Word" by Elton John 
Top 6:  "Stuck in a Moment You Can't Get Out Of" by U2 
Top 5:  "The Lady Is A Tramp"
Top 4:  "Eye of the Tiger" by Survivor 
Top 4:  "I Don't Want to Miss a Thing" by Aerosmith 
Top 3:  "Angels" by Robbie Williams 
Top 3:  "Two Princes" by Spin Doctors
Finale:  "Unwell" by matchbox twenty 
Finale:  "Sorry Seems To Be The Hardest Word" by Elton John 
Finale:  "Standing Tall"

Discography
 KS EP (2003)
 Idol 2004: De Elleve Finalistene (2004)
 Kjartan Salvesen (2004)
 Then Silence (2007)

References

External links
 Kjartan Salvesen, official website
 Kjartan's Myspace, official Myspace

1976 births
Living people
Idol (Norwegian TV series) participants
Idols (TV series) winners
Norwegian expatriates in Denmark
Norwegian pop singers
Musicians from Sandnes
Norwegian floorball players
21st-century Norwegian singers
21st-century Norwegian male singers